Merixen (also written Mariksene) is a village in the commune of Debdeb, in In Amenas District, Illizi Province, Algeria, located on the southern edge of the Grand Erg Oriental.

References

Neighbouring towns and cities

Populated places in Illizi Province